Eugenio Soto (born 9 March 1972) is a Puerto Rican basketball player. He competed in the men's tournament at the 1996 Summer Olympics.

References

1972 births
Living people
People from Aguadilla, Puerto Rico
Puerto Rican men's basketball players
Olympic basketball players of Puerto Rico
Basketball players at the 1996 Summer Olympics
Place of birth missing (living people)
1998 FIBA World Championship players